Farmers Mills, New York may refer to:

Farmers Mills, Oneida County, New York, a hamlet in the town of Kirkland
Farmers Mills, Putnam County, New York